Poekilosoma is a genus of beetles in the family Cerambycidae, containing the following species:

 Poekilosoma carinatipenne Lane, 1941
 Poekilosoma ornatum (Dalman, 1823)

References

Prioninae